Busangan (also Romanized as Būsangān and Būsengān; also known as Būsanjān and Būstegān) is a village in Kuh Mareh Khami Rural District, in the Central District of Basht County, Kohgiluyeh and Boyer-Ahmad Province, Iran. At the 2006 census, its population was 105, in 18 families.

References 

Populated places in Basht County